Revelieria is a genus of beetles in the family Latridiidae, containing the following species:

 Revelieria california Fall, 1899
 Revelieria genei (Aube, 1850)

References

Latridiidae genera